The Roman Catholic Archiocese of Johannesburg is the Metropolitan See for the Ecclesiastical province of Johannesburg in South Africa.

History
 June 4, 1886: Established as Apostolic Prefecture of Transvaal from the Apostolic Vicariate of Natal 
 September 16, 1904: Promoted as Apostolic Vicariate of Transvaal 
 April 9, 1948: Renamed as Apostolic Vicariate of Johannesburg
 January 11, 1951: Promoted as Diocese of Johannesburg 
 June 5, 2007: Promoted as Metropolitan Archdiocese of Johannesburg

Special churches
 The cathedral is the Cathedral of Christ the King in Johannesburg.
 Regina Mundi Catholic Church in Moroka Soweto

Bishops
 Vicars Apostolic of Transvaal (Roman rite) 
 Bishop William Miller, O.M.I. (September 17, 1904 – May 2, 1912)
 Bishop Charles Cox, O.M.I. (July 15, 1914 – July 14, 1924)
 Vicars Apostolic of Johannesburg (Roman rite)
 Bishop David O'Leary (Bishop), O.M.I. (May 13, 1925 – November 25, 1950)
 Bishop William Patrick Whelan, O.M.I. (November 25, 1950 – January 11, 1951 see below)
 Bishops of Johannesburg (Roman rite) 
 Bishop William Patrick Whelan, O.M.I. (see above January 11, 1951 - July 18, 1954), appointed Archbishop of Bloemfontein
 Bishop Hugh Boyle (July 18, 1954 – January 24, 1976)
 Archbishop (personal title) Joseph Patrick Fitzgerald, O.M.I. (January 24, 1976 – July 2, 1984)
 Bishop Reginald Joseph Orsmond (July 2, 1984 – May 19, 2002)
 Archbishop (personal title) Buti Joseph Tlhagale, O.M.I. (April 8, 2003 – June 5, 2007 see below)
 Archbishops of Johannesburg (Roman rite)
 Archbishop Buti Joseph Tlhagale, O.M.I. (aee above June 5, 2007 -)

Coadjutor Vicar Apostolic 
William Patrick Whelan, O.M.I. (1948-1950)

Auxiliary Bishops
Peter Fanyana John Butelezi, O.M.I. (1972-1975), appointed Bishop of Umtata
Zithulele Patrick Mvemve (1986-1994), appointed Bishop of Klerksdorp
Reginald Joseph Orsmond (1983-1984), appointed Bishop here
Duncan Theodore Tsoke (2016-2021), appointed Bishop of Kimberly

Other priests of this diocese who became bishops
Peter John Holiday, appointed Bishop of Kroonstad in 2011
Luc Julian Matthys (priest here, 1961–1976), appointed Bishop of Armidale, Australia in 1999
Thomas Graham Rose, appointed Bishop of Dundee in 2008

Suffragan dioceses
 Klerksdorp
 Manzini
 Witbank

See also
Roman Catholicism in South Africa

References

External links
 Official website
 GCatholic.org
 Catholic Hierarchy 

Roman Catholic dioceses in South Africa
Religious organizations established in 1886
Christianity in Johannesburg
Roman Catholic dioceses and prelatures established in the 19th century
Establishments in the South African Republic
1886 establishments in the South African Republic
A